Ramsgate Town railway station is a former railway station in Ramsgate, in the Thanet district of Kent, England.  It was the seaside resort's first station, but was closed in 1926 when a new, more direct railway line bypassed it and the town's other station, Ramsgate Harbour.

History
Ramsgate developed as one of South East England's main seaside resorts in the 19th century.  It became a natural target during the "Railway Mania" period of the 1840s, and the South Eastern Railway company was the first to reach it when it built a route which branched off from the South Eastern Main Line at Ashford.  This reached Canterbury on 6 February 1846 and Ramsgate on 13 April of that year.   Ramsgate station, as it was then called, was built as a terminus station: when a further extension was built to Margate Sands station on 1 December 1846, trains had to reverse at Ramsgate to continue their journey.

Ramsgate Harbour station opened on 5 October 1863; it was much closer to the seafront and the town centre than the Town station.  Both stations bore the name Ramsgate until 1871; the Harbour station was then renamed Ramsgate & St Lawrence-on-Sea.  On 1 July 1899, it became Ramsgate Harbour, and Ramsgate was renamed Ramsgate Town.

The Southern Railway company took over the South Eastern Railway's operations on 1 January 1923 as a result of the Grouping Act. The route bypassed both stations, and two new stations—Dumpton Park and Ramsgate—were built on it to serve the town. From that date, the section of line between the new junction and Ramsgate Town station, and the station itself, were closed. The station was demolished immediately after closure and the site of the station is now covered by housing development, erasing all trace of the railway. A stub end of the line remains as two carriage sidings adjacent to the south of the present station terminating at Wilfred Road. The route of the line to Ramsgate Town station lies about where Station Approach Road has now been built. The station stood on the west side of Margate Road, at what is now the junction with Station Approach Road.

Accidents and incidents
On 11 August 1858, a passenger train collided with the buffers. Twenty people were injured.
On 11 March 1913, a passenger train failed to stop at the station. It pushed a van through the buffer stops. Ten people were injured. The accident was caused by the failure to connect the brake pipe between the locomotive and its train.

References

Notes

Bibliography

External links
1872 map of the neighbourhood of the station

Ramsgate
Disused railway stations in Kent
Former South Eastern Railway (UK) stations
Railway stations in Great Britain opened in 1846
Railway stations in Great Britain closed in 1926
1846 establishments in England